Collagenous colitis is an inflammatory bowel disease affecting the colon specifically with peak incidence in the 5th decade of life, affecting women more than men.  Its clinical presentation involves watery diarrhea in the absence of rectal bleeding.  It is often classified under the umbrella entity microscopic colitis, that it shares with a related condition, lymphocytic colitis.

Signs and symptoms
Microscopic colitis causes chronic watery diarrhea with greater than 10 bowel movements per day. Some patients report nocturnal diarrhea, abdominal pain, urgency, fecal incontinence, fatigue, dehydration and weight loss. Patients report a significantly diminished quality of life.

Causes
The cause of collagenous colitis is unknown.

Diagnosis
On colonoscopy, the mucosa of the colon typically looks normal, but biopsies of affected tissue usually show deposition of collagen in the lamina propria, which is the area of connective tissue between colonic glands.  Radiological tests, such as a barium enema are also typically normal.

Treatment
First line treatment for collagenous colitis is the use of budesonide, a steroid that works locally in the colon and is highly cleared by first pass effect. Other medications that can be used are the following:
 Bismuth agents, including Pepto-Bismol
 5-aminosalicylic acid
 Immunosuppressants, including azathioprine
 Infliximab

Pilot-scale studies have shown some evidence of possible benefit for both Boswellia serrata extract and specific strains of probiotics in the treatment of collagenous colitis, although larger sample sizes are needed to confirm the results.

See also
 Colitis
 Lymphocytic colitis
 Inflammatory bowel disease
 Ulcerative colitis

References

External links 

Colitis
Steroid-responsive inflammatory conditions